Julio Enrique Valera Torres (born October 13, 1968) is a former Major League Baseball pitcher who played for five seasons. Valera was traded by the Mets to the Angels in exchange for shortstop Dick Schofield.

External links

1968 births
Living people
Atlantic City Surf players
California Angels players
Columbus Clippers players
Kansas City Royals players
Lake Elsinore Storm players
Major League Baseball pitchers
Major League Baseball players from Puerto Rico
Midland Angels players
Nashua Pride players
New York Mets players
Norwich Navigators players
Omaha Royals players
People from Aguadilla, Puerto Rico
Puerto Rican expatriate baseball players in Canada
St. Lucie Mets players
Tidewater Tides players
Vancouver Canadians players
Columbia Mets players
Jackson Mets players
Kingsport Mets players
Puerto Rican expatriate baseball players in Mexico
Puerto Rican expatriate baseball players in Taiwan
Rojos del Águila de Veracruz players
Sultanes de Monterrey players
Uni-President Lions players